Francis Louis Graves, known as Frank Graves, is a Canadian applied social researcher. He is the founder and president of Ekos Research Associates.

Education
Graves received a Bachelor of Arts in social anthropology from Carleton University in 1976 and a Master of Arts in sociology from Carleton University in 1977. He has completed doctoral coursework in sociology.

Career
Graves has lectured at the Rotman School of Management, the Kennedy School at Harvard, the University of Ottawa, and the Woodrow Wilson School of Public and International Affairs in Washington, DC.

Graves also serves on the advisory board at the Sprott School of Business at Carleton University.

In an April 2010 interview with Lawrence Martin, Graves acknowledged that he informally advised the Liberal Party to invoke a "culture war" by accusing the Conservative Party of being homophobic, racist, and autocratic. Graves later apologized for what he described as his "incendiary" comments. Conservative Party President, John Walsh, filed a complaint with the Canadian Broadcasting Corporation (CBC), given that Graves was providing polling services to the CBC at the time. An investigation conducted by the CBC ombudsman concluded that "whatever Mr. Graves's private views, CBC journalists do not appear to have violated CBC's Journalistic Standards and Practices in dealing with him."

In April 2022, Graves criticized Conservative Party of Canada leadership candidate Pierre Poilievre and his supporters in a series of Twitter messages, including a statement to Poilievre: "You are on notice. Going to make sure you are never going to lead my country. I don’t make idle threats."

Select publications 
Northern Populism: Causes and Consequences of the New Ordered Outlook, University of Calgary School of Public Policy SPP Research Papers, Vol. 13:15 (June 2020), University of Calgary.
Redesigning Work: A Blueprint for Canada’s Future Well-Being and Prosperity. Graham Lowe and Frank Graves. Canada: Rotman/UTP Publishing, 2016. Print.
Understanding the New Public Outlook on the Economy and Middle-Class Decline, University of Calgary School of Public Policy SPP Research Papers, Vol. 9:6 (February 2016), University of Calgary.
The Reinstatement of Progressive Canada, Institute for Research on Public Policy, 11 January 2016
Democratic Reform and the Trust Factor, Policy Magazine (Volume 4, Issue 1, pp. 11–14), January–February 2016
"Being Canadian Today: Images in a Fractured Mirror", Canada: the State of the Federation 2012, Loleen Berdahl et al. McGill-Queen’s University Press, 2015. Print.
"Canadian Public Opinion on Taxes", Tax is Not a Four-Letter Word: A Different Take on Taxes in Canada, Alex Himelfarb et al. Waterloo, ON: Wilfrid Laurier University Press, 4 October 2013. Print.
"Canada-US in Flux: Toward a Big North American Idea", In Canada-U.S. Project (2009): 2-8.
North America: Mosaic, Community, or Fortress? Published in NORTEAMÉRICA revista académia Year 2, number 2, July–December 2007
The Shifting Public Outlook on Risk and Security, One Issue, Two Voices (Volume 4 - Threat Perceptions in the United States and Canada), Joint Publication of the Canada Institute and the Woodrow Wilson International Centre for Scholars, October 2005 
Polling on Trial: Lessons from the 2004 Canadian Election, Imprints, December 2004.
"Canadians and Privacy", Imprints (Journal of the Professional Market Research Society), October 2000.
Collaborative Government: Looking for a Canadian Way. In Collaborative Government: Is there a Canadian Way? New Directions Series, Vol. 6. Toronto: The Institute of Public Administration of Canada, December 1999, pp. 12–22.
Rethinking Government as if People Mattered: From Reaganomics to "Humanomics". In Leslie A. Pal, ed. How Ottawa Spends 1999-2000: Shape-Shifting: Canadian Governance Toward the 21st Century. Toronto: Oxford University Press, 1999.
Identity and National Attachment in Contemporary Canada, with Tim Dugas and Patrick Beauchamp. In Harvey Lazar and Tom McIntosh, eds. Canada: The State of the Federation 1998-99 (Vol. 13: How Canadians Connect). Kingston: Institute of Intergovernmental Relations, 1999.
Canadians and their Public Institutions. Frank L. Graves and Paul Reed. Optimum: The Journal of Public Sector Management, 28:4 (1999), pp. 1–8
La question du chômage et le caractère distinctif de l’électorat québécois au scrutin fédéral de 1993, with BenoÎt Gauthier and François-Pierre Gingras, Revue québécoise de science politique, no 27, Spring 1996
Strengthening the Dialogue between Program Evaluation and Market Research: Toward Ongoing Monitoring and Evaluation Systems (OMES), Canadian Journal of Program Evaluation, Vol. 3:1 (1988)
There Goes the Neighbourhood?: The Impact of Accessory Apartments on Neighbouring Properties, Canadian Housing, Vol. 4:4 (Winter 1987)
The Role of Economics in Evaluating Public Investment in the Arts in Paying for the Arts, published by The Association for Cultural Economics, Editors H.H. Chartrand, W.S. Hendron, and H. Horowitz. Akron, Ohio, 1987
Towards Practical Rigour: Methodological and Strategic Considerations for Program Evaluation, in Optimum, Bureau of Management Consulting, Vol. 15:4 (1984)
Methodological Considerations for Evaluating Multi-Level Cultural Support Programs in Governments and Culture (Volume 2) of the Proceedings of the Third International Conference on Cultural Economics and Planning, 1985
Functional and Elective Illiteracy in Canada with B. Kinsley, Canadian Journal of Education, Vol. 8:4 (Autumn 1983), pp. 315–331
Explorations in Time Use in The Time of Our Lives, Volume 2, for the Government of Canada, edited by B. Kinsley. DOC 1984. WH-7-272E

References

20th-century Canadian businesspeople
21st-century Canadian businesspeople
Living people
Pollsters
Year of birth missing (living people)